Taz is a video game developed and released by Atari, Inc. in 1983 for the Atari 2600. It features the Looney Tunes character the Tasmanian Devil in a food frenzy. Within the game, Taz only appears as a tornado. The same game was later released as Asterix, with the character Asterix instead of Taz.

Gameplay 

The player guides Taz between the stage lines in order to eat hamburgers and avoid the dynamites. The game does not use any buttons and the difficulty increases by increasing the speed of the objects on screen. As the game progresses, the burgers may change into other edible or drinkable objects such as root beers, hamburgers, etc. There are not many sound effects in the game except a blipping sound when the player hits an edible object and another sound that resembles of explosion when the player hits dynamite.

References 

1983 video games
Atari 2600 games
Atari 2600-only games
Atari games
Video games about food and drink
Video games featuring the Tasmanian Devil (Looney Tunes)
Video games developed in the United States
Video games based on Asterix
Cartoon Network video games
Single-player video games